Choi Eun-hee (November 20, 1926 – April 16, 2018) was a South Korean actress, who was one of the country's most popular stars of the 1960s and 1970s. In 1978, Choi and her then ex-husband, movie director Shin Sang-ok, were abducted to North Korea, where they were forced to make films until they sought asylum at the U.S. embassy in Vienna in 1986. They returned to South Korea in 1999 after spending a decade in the United States.

Biography

Early career and success in South Korea 
Choi was born in Gwangju, Gyeonggi Province in 1926. Her first acting role was in the 1947 film, A New Oath. She rose to fame the following year after starring in the 1948 film, The Sun of Night, and soon became known as one of the "troika" of Korean film, alongside actresses Kim Ji-mee and Um Aing-ran.

After marrying the director Shin Sang-ok in 1954, the two founded Shin Film. Choi went on to act in over 130 films and was considered one of the biggest stars of South Korean film in the 1960s and 1970s. She starred in many of Shin's iconic films including 1958's A Flower in Hell and 1961's The Houseguest and My Mother.

After she was diagnosed with infertility, they adopted two children together, Jeong-kyun and Myung-kim.

Abduction and years in North Korea 

In 1976, Choi divorced Shin after seeing news that he had fathered two children with the young actress Oh Su-mi. Choi's career began to suffer after her divorce, and she traveled to Hong Kong in 1978 to meet with a person posing as a businessman who offered to set up a new film company with her. In Hong Kong, Choi was abducted and taken to North Korea by the order of Kim Jong-il. While searching for Choi after her abduction, Shin was also abducted and taken to North Korea soon after.

In North Korea, Choi and Shin were remarried, at Kim's recommendation. Kim had them make films together, including 1985's Salt, for which Choi won best actress at the 14th Moscow International Film Festival. Choi later said that the couple was able to make "films with artistic values, instead of just propaganda films extolling the regime," but that she could not forgive Kim for kidnapping her. While in North Korea, Choi converted to Roman Catholicism.

Escape and later life 
The couple finally staged their escape in 1986 while on a trip to Vienna, where they fled to the U.S. embassy and requested political asylum. They lived in Reston, Virginia, then Beverly Hills, California, before returning to South Korea in 1999.

On April 16, 2018, Choi died in hospital where she was due to have a kidney dialysis during the afternoon. Her death resulted in widespread mourning across South Korea.

In media 
In 2015, film producer and writer Paul Fischer released an English-language biography of Choi's and Shin's lives titled A Kim Jong-Il Production: The Extraordinary True Story of a Kidnapped Filmmaker. In January 2016, at the 2016 Sundance Film Festival, in the World Cinema Documentary Competition, a documentary about the North Korean ordeal, entitled The Lovers and the Despot, directed by Robert Cannan and Ross Adam, was presented.

Select filmography

Awards

Buil Film Awards

Blue Dragon Film Awards

Grand Bell Awards

Other awards

Bibliography

See also
 Abduction of Shin Sang-ok and Choi Eun-hee
 Shin Sang-ok

References

Works cited

Further reading

External links
 Choi Eun-hee at Korean Movie Database
 

1926 births
2018 deaths
20th-century South Korean actresses
Kidnapped South Korean people
South Korean Roman Catholics
North Korean abductions
People from Gyeonggi Province
People from Gwangju, Gyeonggi